Eslamabad-e Javid (also Romanized as Eslāmābād-e Jāvīd; also known as Eslāmābād) is a village in Javid-e Mahuri Rural District, in the Central District of Mamasani County, Fars Province, Iran. At the 2006 census, its population was 255, in 48 families.

References 

Populated places in Mamasani County